German submarine U-270 was a Type VIIC U-boat of Nazi Germany's Kriegsmarine during World War II. The submarine was laid down on 15 October 1941 at the Bremer-Vulkan-Vegesacker Werft (yard) in Bremen as yard number 35. She was launched on 11 July 1942 and commissioned on 5 September under the command of Oberleutnant zur See Paul-Fredrich Otto.

In six patrols, she caused one British warship of 1370 tons to be declared a total loss. She was a member of seven wolfpacks.

She was sunk on 13 August 1944 in the Bay of Biscay by an Australian aircraft.

Design
German Type VIIC submarines were preceded by the shorter Type VIIB submarines. U-270 had a displacement of  when at the surface and  while submerged. She had two shafts and two  propellers.

U-270 was fitted with five  torpedo tubes (four fitted at the bow and one at the stern), fourteen torpedoes, one  SK C/35 naval gun, 220 rounds, and two twin  C/30 anti-aircraft guns. The boat had a complement of between forty-four and sixty.

Service history
After training with the 8th U-boat Flotilla, the boat became operational on 1 April 1943 when she was transferred to the 6th flotilla.

First and second patrols
U-270s first patrol began when she departed Kiel on 23 March 1943. She entered the Atlantic Ocean after negotiating the gap between Iceland and the Faroe Islands. Two crew members were injured in bad weather on 4 April. She then docked at the French Atlantic port of St. Nazaire on 15 May.

For her second sortie, the boat moved through the Atlantic waters off northwest Spain.

Third and fourth patrols
She attacked the British frigate  which caused the warship to be declared a total loss. During an attack on a convoy in mid-Atlantic, the boat's pressure hull was cracked by depth charges dropped by the escorts; the submarine was forced to return to base.

U-270 was attacked by a British B-17 Flying Fortress on 6 January 1944 and succeeded in shooting the aircraft down, but not before sufficient damage was caused to force the U-boat to curtail the patrol.

Fifth patrol
The submarine was returning to base after being attacked and badly damaged by a Vickers Wellington of No. 172 Squadron RAF, when she was attacked by a second Fortress, this time from 53 Squadron. This B-17 was also shot down, but did not cause any further damage to the boat. Among the casualties here were Bert Peters, a former Victorian Football League player.

Sixth patrol and loss
U-270 departed Lorient for the last time on 10 August 1944. In the Bay of Biscay, she was attacked and sunk by an Australian Sunderland flying boat of No. 461 Squadron RAAF on the 13th.

There were no deaths; seventy-one men survived. The German version of U 270 reports of 10 men dead and 71 survived; the boat was overloaded with staff, being evacuated. U 270

Wolfpacks
U-270 took part in seven wolfpacks, namely:
 Löwenherz (4 – 10 April 1943) 
 Lerche (10 – 16 April 1943) 
 Specht (21 April – 4 May 1943) 
 Fink (4 – 5 May 1943) 
 Leuthen (15 – 23 September 1943) 
 Borkum (18 December 1943 – 3 January 1944) 
 Borkum 1 (3 – 6 January 1944)

Summary of raiding history

References

Notes

Citations

Bibliography

External links

World War II submarines of Germany
German Type VIIC submarines
U-boats commissioned in 1942
1942 ships
Ships built in Bremen (state)
U-boats sunk by Australian aircraft
Ships sunk with no fatalities
U-boats sunk in 1944
World War II shipwrecks in the Atlantic Ocean
Maritime incidents in August 1944